Maxwell Julien Banks (July 12, 1933 – January 1, 2022), better known by his stage name Max Julien, was an American actor, sculptor, and clothes designer best known for his role as Goldie in the 1973 blaxploitation film The Mack. Julien also appeared in Def Jam's How to Be a Player and he guest starred on TV shows such as The Mod Squad, The Bold Ones: The Protectors, and One on One.

He began his career on the stage on New York City's Off-Broadway circuit including roles in Joseph Papp's Shakespeare-In-The-Park. Moving westward to Hollywood, he landed co-starring roles with Jack Nicholson in Psych-Out and Candice Bergen in Columbia's box-office hit film Getting Straight. While spending time in Rome, Italy, he wrote and directed a documentary called Trestevre, then wrote the screenplay for, and subsequently co-produced, Warner Brothers's blaxploitation classic Cleopatra Jones, which starred actress Tamara Dobson in the title role as a narcotics agent who was as skilled in martial arts as she was with firearms. Julien refused to participate in the sequel, Cleopatra Jones and the Casino of Gold, which led to his being credited instead with the film's story and script both being "based on characters created by Max Julien".

Critics
For his performance in 1968's Up Tight!, New York Times movie critic Judith Crist stated that Julien was, "a standout in a standout cast." Raoul Gripenwaldt from The Santa Monica Evening Outlook wrote, "Max Julien's portrayal of Johnny Wells in Paramount's Uptight could very well result in an Academy Award." The Hollywood Reporter chimed in, "Max Julien creates a memorable piece of reality." As a reward, Julien was invited to Europe to discuss film possibilities.

In popular culture
Curren$y's 2012 mixtape "Priest Andretti" features a song named after the actor, produced by Beat Butcha. The New Orleans rapper also mentions Max Julien in his song, "What's What," off of his 2011 album Weekend at Burnie's.
 Many rappers have sampled his voice from The Mack, including Craig Mack, Lloyd Banks, Gangrene, Big K.R.I.T. and Do or Die. Multiple R&B, hip-hop and rock artists (i.e., Too Short, Rappin' 4-Tay, P. Diddy, Snoop Dogg, Kid Rock) admittedly fashioned their images after Julien's character from the film.
 Julien appeared as "Goldie" in an episode of UPN's One on One.

Personal life and death
Julien was born in Washington, DC on July 12, 1933. He crossed through the Xi Chapter of Kappa Alpha Psi at Howard University on the December 4, 1954.

Julien was in a live-in relationship with actress Vonetta McGee from 1974 to 1977. McGee appeared with him in the 1974 western action film Thomasine & Bushrod, which was intended as a counterpart to the 1967 film Bonnie and Clyde. He married Arabella Chavers in 1991. The couple resided in Los Angeles. He died there on January 1, 2022, at the age of 88. Along with his wife, he is survived by a daughter.

Filmography

The Black Klansman (1966) - Raymond
Psych-Out (1968) - Elwood
The Savage Seven (1968) - Grey Wolf
Up Tight! (1968) - Johnny Wells
The Mod Squad (TV) - Jack Dawson (1968) 1 episode
The Bold Ones: The Protectors (TV) - Coley Walker (1969) pilot episode "Deadlock"
CBS Playhouse (TV) - Joe Barnes (1969) 1 episode
Getting Straight (1970) - Ellis
The Name of the Game (TV) - Mjoma (1970) 1 episode
The Mack (1973) - Goldie
Cleopatra Jones (1973) Screenwriter
Thomasine & Bushrod (1974) - Bushrod
Def Jam's How to Be a Player (1997) - Uncle Fred
Restore (2001) - Coach Barnes
One on One (TV) - Goldie (2005) 1 episode

References

External links

 

1933 births
2022 deaths
20th-century African-American people
21st-century African-American people
African-American male actors
American male film actors
American male television actors
Male actors from Washington, D.C.
20th-century American male actors
21st-century American male actors
20th-century American screenwriters
20th-century American male writers
American male screenwriters
Screenwriters from Washington, D.C.
African-American male writers
African-American screenwriters